Crime in France is combated by a range of French law enforcement agencies.

Crime by type

Murder 

Though France's homicide rate fluctuated substantially in recent years, it tended to decrease through 2000 - 2014 period ending at 1.2 cases per 100,000 population in 2014.

Many terrorist attacks have occurred in France, especially from the mid-1970s onwards. These include the 1995 France bombings, January 2015 Ile-de-France attacks, the November 2015 Paris attacks, the 2016 Magnanville stabbing, the 2016 Nice truck attack, the 2016 Normandy church attack, and the 2018 Paris knife attack. These attacks have been one of the reasons for the homicide rate fluctuation after 2014.

In September 2018, a police chief was stabbed to death in the city of Rodez. "The attacker was known to police. He had defaced the city hall door on 11 April," said Christian Teyssèdre, the Mayor of Rodez.

On 31 August 2019, a 19-year-old man was stabbed to death and eight others wounded, in Villeurbanne, Lyon. Two men, armed with a knife and a skewer, carried out the attack.

On 29 October 2020, Mayor Christian Estrosi said that 3 people were killed and several more were wounded in a suspected terror attack inside the Notre Dame Basilica church in the French city of Nice. Officials claim that this was a terror attack.

Rape 

In 1971, the rape rate stood at 2.0 per 100,000 people. While in 1995, it was 12.5. In 2009, it stood at 16.2. According to a 2012 report, about 75,000 rapes take place each year.

According to a 2014 article, about 5,000 to 7,000 of the rapes are gang rapes.

Organized crime 

 is a category of organized crime in France. Criminal groups associated with the  work in every major city in France, but are mostly concentrated in Marseille, Grenoble, Paris, and Lyon.

Corruption 

In 2011, Transparency International concluded in its annual report for 2011 that France does not do enough to stop corruption. A TNS Sofres poll in October 2011 indicated that 72% of the French public had the perception that politicians are corrupt.

By location

Priority Security Zones 

In August 2012, the French Government announced the creation of fifteen "Priority Security Zones"' in an effort to target crime hotspots. Extra police, riot police, detectives and members of the intelligence services are to be mobilised. Social services, educational bodies and charities also put extra resources into the selected areas.

The Neuhof area of Strasbourg was selected because of a need to tackle violent crime, and the historic rural town of Chambly to the north of Paris is being focused on because of rising burglary rates and car theft. The northern quarter of Amiens in the Somme region and areas of Seine-Saint-Denis to the north of Paris, which witnessed fierce rioting in 2005, are priority zones because of widespread drug dealing and a rampant black market.

Paris 
Violent crime is relatively uncommon in the city centre. Pickpockets are the most significant problem and are commonly children under the age of 16 because they are difficult to prosecute. Pickpockets are very active on the rail link from Charles de Gaulle Airport to the city centre.

The Paris Police Prefecture publishes a pamphlet entitled "Paris in Complete Safety" that provides practical advice and useful telephone numbers for visitors. In an emergency, dialling 17 will connect the caller to the police. You can also dial the Europe-wide emergency response number 112 to reach an operator for any kind of emergency service (similar to the U.S. and Canadian 911 system). Non-French speakers may experience a delay while an English speaker is located.

In 2014, thousands of demonstrators protested the Israeli-Gaza conflict for over a week. During several instances rioters shouted anti-Semitic chants and attacked Jews while ransacking Jewish synagogues and Jewish-owned businesses. Large demonstrations in Paris are generally managed by a strong police presence, but such events have the potential to become dangerous. Likewise, some sporting events, such as soccer matches, have occasionally degenerated into violence have continued into the streets.

In 2017, a Russian performance artist was detained in Paris after setting fire to the front of a branch of France's central bank. On the third of October, in an affluent neighbourhood near the Paris Saint-Germain's football ground, the police found four gas canisters doused with petrol and wired to connect to a mobile phone. The government has suspected bomb-making equipment found and arrests have been made in France and Spain.

References

External links